Kaare Lien (born 9 November 1935 in Skoger, Norway) is a Canadian former ski jumper who competed in the 1964 Winter Olympics.

References

1935 births
Living people
Canadian male ski jumpers
Olympic ski jumpers of Canada
Ski jumpers at the 1964 Winter Olympics
Canadian people of Norwegian descent
Sportspeople from Drammen